Jaye Nāpua Greig-Nakasone (born March 4, 1974), known professionally as Nāpua Greig, is a Hawaiian musician, vocalist, songwriter, record producer, kumu hula (hula teacher), and educator from Maui, Hawaii. Known primarily for her contributions as kumu hula of Hālau Nā Lei Kaumaka O Uka, she arranges traditional Hawaiian music as well, performing and recording with instruments such as ukulele, ipu, and other traditional Hawaiian hula implements. She has released four solo albums, each earning a Nā Hōkū Hanohano Award.

In 2014, Greig voiced the character "Lele" in the Pixar animated short film Lava, alongside fellow musician, Kuana Torres Kahele, who voiced "Uku." It hit #1 on the Billboard World Digital Song Sales chart in July 2015.

In 2015, Greig ran unsuccessfully for the upcountry Maui County Council seat representing Pukalani, Kula, and Ulupalakua.

Hālau 
After successfully completing the ʻūniki process from her kumu hula, Greig launched her own hula hālau. Today, she currently operates three hālau: Hālau Nā Lei Kaumaka O Uka, Hālau O Ka Ua Makanoe (Chiba, Japan), and Hālau O Naleihiwa (Sapporo, Japan).

Hālau Nā Lei Kaumaka O Uka is Greig's primary hālau. The hālau was originally founded in 1996 with her sister kumu hula Kahulu Maluo-Huber. The hālau is a registered 501(c)(3) non-profit organization. Currently, the hālau serves over 200 hula students on the island of Maui ages 5 and up. Hālau Nā Lei Kaumaka O Uka has won awards including at the Merrie Monarch Festival, the Hula ʻOni E, Queen Liliʻuokalani Keiki Hula Festival, the Hula O Nā Keiki, Moku o Keawe International Hula Festival, and the Kū Mai Ka Hula.

Discography

Solo albums 

 2021: Home
 2017: Makawalu
 2013: Kūlaia
 2011: Mōhalu
 2008: Pihana

Contributions 
 2012: Mana Maoli Vol. IV - Too Much Heaven ft. Rush House
 2011: Hōʻala ʻIapana - Puna Kuʻu Aloha

Makawalu
Makawalu (2017), meaning "Eight eyes", culminated several years of Greig's research and composing, and features more original compositions than her other projects. The album encourages the listener to look beyond the surface. Greig took in her surroundings and her practices and wove them into 12 songs, and then into hula dances.

The album was nominated for 10 Nā Hōkū Hanohano awards at the 41st Annual Nā Hōkū Hanohano Awards, including Album of the Year, Female Vocalist of the Year, Hawaiian Album of the Year, Music Video of the Year, Engineering (Hawaiian), Hawaiian Language, Graphics Award, Liner Notes, and Haku Mele (Composer).

Music Awards

Nā Hōkū Hanohano Awards 
The Na Hoku Hanohano Awards, occasionally called the "Hoku Awards", are the premier music awards in Hawaii and are Hawaii's equivalent to the Grammy Awards. The awards are presented to the musicians exemplifying the best work in their class. Greig, has been nominated for the Nā Hōkū Hanohano Awards more than a dozen times for a number of award categories. She has won an award six times, one of which was an adjudicated award for Best Graphics on her Makawalu album. The album was designed by multiple award-winning graphic design artist Wailani Artates of Artisty8.

Filmography

Politics 
In 2015, Greig announced her candidacy for the upcountry Maui County Council seat representing, Pukalani, Kula, and Ulupalakua. The seat was vacated by longtime council member Gladys Baisa who met the maximum number of terms and could no longer run for the seat again. When asked about her candidacy, Greig credited her parents for exposing her and her siblings to campaigns at an early age and therefore the candidacy fulfilled a lifelong commitment to public service.

Greig captured 42% of the votes and lost the seat to longtime local Democratic party official, Yuki-Lei Sugimura, who secured 43.9% by 1,050 votes.

References

External links 
 NapuaMusic.com

1974 births
Living people
Songwriters from Hawaii
Na Hoku Hanohano Award winners
People from Maui County, Hawaii
Native Hawaiian musicians